A cat is a domesticated mammal of the Felis catus species.

Cat or CAT may also refer to:

Animals
 Felidae (the cats or felids), a family of Carnivorans
 Pantherinae (big cats), a subfamily
 Felinae (small cats), the other subfamily

Arts and entertainment

Comic books 
 Cat (comics), a list of various characters
 Confidential Assassination Troop, a manhua by Fung Chin Pang from 2003

Film and television 
 the title character of Cat Ballou, a 1965 film
 Cat (Red Dwarf), a character on the sci-fi sitcom
 Cat, a character on CatDog
 Cat MacKenzie, a character on Family Affairs
 Cat Valentine (Victorious), a character in Victorious and Sam & Cat

Music 
 Cat Records, 1954–1956, an R&B subsidiary of Atlantic Records
 Cat Records (TK label), 1969–1980
 Cat #1, a 1994 album by Peter Criss
 "Cat", by C418 from Minecraft - Volume Alpha, 2011
 "Cat", a song by Relient K from the 2016 album Air for Free

Video games 
 C.A.T.: Cyber Attack Team, 2003

Businesses and organisations

Based in the United States 

 Caterpillar Inc., a manufacturer of construction and mining equipment
 Secret Service Counter Assault Team

Based in the United Kingdom 
 Cambridge Antibody Technology, a biotechnology company
 Centre for Alternative Technology, a charity and eco-centre in mid Wales
 Competition Appeal Tribunal, a public body

Other businesses and organisations 
 CAT Telecom, a telecoms operator in Thailand
 Committee Against Torture, a United Nations treaty body
 Crew Against Torture (Russia), a Russian non-governmental organisation

Education 
 Common Admission Test, in India
 Cognitive Abilities Test, in the United States
 Computerized adaptive testing, a method for administering tests

Places

Turkey 
 Çat, a town and district in Erzurum Province
 Çat Dam, on the Abdülharap River in Adıyaman Province

Elsewhere 
 Kingdom of Cat, an early-Mediaeval Pictish kingdom in what is now Scotland
 Cat Cays, a pair of reef islands in the Bahamas
 Cat Island (disambiguation)

Science, technology and mathematics

Biology, medicine and psychology

Biochemistry  
 CAT, the gene for Catalase
 Chloramphenicol acetyltransferase, an enzyme and antibiotic resistance gene
 Methcathinone or cat, a drug
 TAT, a codon for the amino acid Histidine

Psychology 
 Communication accommodation theory
 Cognitive analytic therapy

Other uses in biology and medicine 
 Calibrated automated thrombogram (CAT or CT), a coagulation test
 CAT scan or CT scan, a medical imaging X-ray technology
 Combat application tourniquet, a tourniquet developed for use in field combat situations
 Conidial anastomosis tubes, a specialised hyphae emerging from some asexual fungal spores

Computing 
 CAT (phototypesetter) (Computer Assisted Typesetter), a 1972 phototypesetter
 cat (Unix), a Unix utility that concatenates and lists files
 Cat, a clone of the Apple II home computer
 Canon Cat, a desktop computer
 Computer-assisted translation or computer-aided translation
 Computer Aided Transceiver
 Novation CAT, a modem series

Mathematics 
 Cat, the category of small categories in category theory
 CAT(k) space, a type of metric space

Other technologies 
 Catadioptric system, in optics
 Catalytic converter, an exhaust device
 Cherenkov Array at Themis, an atmospheric Cherenkov imaging telescope
 Cosmic Anisotropy Telescope

People 
 Cat (nickname), a list of people with the nickname
 Cat Glover (born 1968), American choreographer, dancer and singer
 Cat Power (born 1972), American singer-songwriter (real name: Charlyn Marshall)
 Cat Rambo (born 1963), American writer and editor
 Cat Stevens (born 1948), British singer-songwriter (real name: Yusuf Islam)

Transportation and aviation

American bus transit systems 
 Camarillo Area Transit, Camarillo, California
 Canby Area Transit, Oregon 
 Capital Area Transit (Harrisburg), Pennsylvania
 Capital Area Transit (Raleigh), North Carolina
 Clemson Area Transit, South Carolina
 Collier Area Transit, Florida

Aviation 
 CAT (magazine), a civil airline simulation and training journal
 Civil Air Transport, a former Chinese airline, in later years owned by the CIA
 Clear-air turbulence
 , a defunct airline of France

Other uses in transport 
 Caterham railway station, Surrey, England
 Center for Appropriate Transport, a community center for bicycles in Eugene, Oregon
 City Airport Train, Vienna, Austria
 (Whitby) cat, an early collier (ship) type
 Perth Central Area Transit

Other uses 
 Cat (zodiac), a Vietnamese sign
 .cat, a top-level domain for Catalan language and culture
 Canadian Army Trophy, a tank gunnery competition
 Central Africa Time, a time zone
 Certified Accounting Technician
 Coital alignment technique, a sexual position
 Cat o' nine tails or the cat, a flogging instrument
 cat, ISO 639-2 and -3 codes for the Catalan language

See also 
 The Cat (disambiguation)
 Cats (disambiguation)
 Kat (disambiguation)
 Qat (disambiguation)